Campanha is a town (município) in the Brazilian state of Minas Gerais. In 2020 its population was estimated at 16,762 inhabitants.  The town is the seat of the Roman Catholic Diocese of Campanha.

References

Municipalities in Minas Gerais